The 2021 World Artistic Gymnastics Championships were held in Kitakyushu, Japan from October 18–24, 2021. The competition took place at the Kitakyushu City General Gymnasium. It was the third time that Japan hosted the event, following the 1995 and 2011 editions.

The competition was originally scheduled to be held in Copenhagen, Denmark, before the Danish Gymnastics Federation withdrew from hosting in July 2020. In November 2020, the Fédération Internationale de Gymnastique announced Kitakyushu as the replacement host city for the same dates.

Although the World Championships are traditionally not held in Olympic years, the postponement of the 2020 Summer Olympics caused the 2021 event to fall during the same year. The last time the Olympics and the World Championships were held in the same year was in 1996.

Competition schedule

Medal summary

Medalists

Medal standings

Overall

Men

Women

Men's results

Individual all-around 
China's Zhang Boheng narrowly defeated reigning Olympic champion Daiki Hashimoto of Japan by 0.017 points to take the title. Both won their first individual World medals. Ukrainian gymnast Illia Kovtun rounded out the podium in bronze.

Both Zhang and Hashimoto later withdrew from the first day of event finals.

Floor 
Nicola Bartolini of Italy won the country's first-ever gold medal on floor, as well as its first World title since Juri Chechi's 1997 win on rings. Silver medalist Kazuki Minami of Japan and bronze medalist Emil Soravuo of Finland also won their first individual World medals. Defending champion Carlos Yulo of the Philippines had a costly out-of-bounds deduction and finished fifth.

Pommel horse 
Stephen Nedoroscik won the United States' first title on pommel horse and the country's first men's title in any event since Danell Leyva won parallel bars in 2011. China's Weng Hao and Kazuma Kaya of Japan tied for the silver medal.

Rings 
Top qualifier Lan Xingyu of China won his first individual World title after previously earning gold as an alternate for the Chinese team in 2018. Marco Lodadio of Italy was called up from first reserve and earned a second consecutive silver on the event, his third World medal overall. Lodadio's teammate Salvatore Maresca and Grigorii Klimentev of RGF tied for the bronze medal, the first individual World medal for both.

Vault

Parallel bars

Horizontal bar

Women's results

Individual all-around 
Angelina Melnikova (RGF) became the first non-American to win a World or Olympic all-around title since her Russian teammate Aliya Mustafina did so at the 2010 World Championships. Americans Leanne Wong and Kayla DiCello won the silver and bronze medals, respectively, the first individual World medal for both.

Vault 
Reigning Olympic champion Rebeca Andrade of Brazil won the title for her first individual World medal. Silver medalist Asia D'Amato is the first Italian female artistic gymnast to ever qualify for a World vault final. Angelina Melnikova (RGF)'s bronze was her second individual medal at the World Championships following the all-around title.

Uneven bars 
Wei Xiaoyuan won the title for her first individual World medal and China's first medal on the event since winning four titles in a row from 2013 to 2017 (tie in 2015). Top qualifier Rebeca Andrade of Brazil earned the silver for her second individual medal of the day. Wei's teammate Luo Rui finished in bronze after losing a tiebreaker to Andrade.

Balance beam

Floor

Qualification

Men's results 
Subdivision 6 of the men's qualification was delayed 90 minutes while the equipment was disinfected after a Colombian gymnast, later revealed to be Jossimar Calvo, in the previous subdivision tested positive for COVID-19. Calvo subsequently withdrew from the all-around final.

Individual all-around

Floor

Pommel horse

Rings

Vault

Parallel bars

Horizontal bar

Women's results

Individual all-around

Vault

Uneven bars

Balance beam

Floor

Participating nations 

 (1)
 (3)
 (8)
 (4)
 (2)
 (3)
 (3)
 (3)
 (10)
 (10)
 (8)
 (9)
 (6)
 (2)
 (4)
 (3)
 (2)
 (10)
 (7)
 (4)
 (6)
 (9)
 (6)
 (4)
 (9)
 (8)
 (6)
 (2)
 (6)
 (10)
 (10) (Host)
 (5)
 (2)
 (4)
 (1)
 (9)
 (8)
 (6)
 (1)
 (1)
 (6)
 RGF (10)
 (2)
 (2)
 (3)
 (3)
 (10)
 (5)
 (6)
 (9)
 (1)
 (2)
 (8)
 (10)
 (10)
 (6)

Notes

References

External links 
 2021 World Artistic Gymnastics Championships at the Fédération Internationale de Gymnastique
 

2021
Sporting events in Japan
World Championships
World Artistic Gymnastics Championships
World Artistic Gymnastics Championships
Sports competitions in Kitakyushu